Sword of Vermilion is an action role-playing game developed and published by Sega for the Mega Drive console in 1989. It was released in 1990 in North America and 1991 in Europe. It was the first console exclusive game designed by the Sega AM2 studio. The game is part of the Sega Genesis Collection for the PlayStation 2 and PlayStation Portable, and was available on the Wii's Virtual Console. In 2021, it was added to the Nintendo Switch Online + Expansion Pack.

Storyline 
Sword of Vermilion is about the son of Erik, king of Excalabria, who takes on a quest of revenge to defeat Tsarkon and free the world of Vermilion from evil.

King Erik V and King Tsarkon were close friends who sought the 8 rings of good and evil to bring peace and balance to the realm. However, the rings of evil changed King Tsarkon and he led his army from Cartahena to invade Excalabria. The defenders were overwhelmed and the castle of King Erik V collapsed.  Erik V summoned his bravest, strongest and most faithful warrior, Blade, to entrust him his infant son with an ancient family heirloom, the Ring of Wisdom. King Erik ordered Blade to save himself and the child before perishing while the castle burned. The remaining rings of good were scattered throughout the realm by King Tsarkon to deter anyone from uniting the rings. King Tsarkon turned the infant prince's mother to living stone and vowed all of Cartahena's power to finding the boy. Blade traveled to a small village named Wyclif, where he settled down and raised the child as his own son.  Eighteen years later, the son of Erik begins his quest upon learning his true destiny upon Blade's death bed.

The quest consists of travelling to towns and villages, battling creatures to gain experience and finding items such as swords, shields and armour, as well as many other items such as Herbs and Candles. Boss monsters take the form of larger, stronger creatures which are integral to the story. Fighting boss monsters takes place in a side view of the battle where magic cannot be used.

Gameplay 

The gameplay features different views and play styles differing from the more traditional RPGs of the time.

 The "Town View" uses the typical overhead angle found in most RPGs.
 The "Battle View" is a tilted overhead view where the player takes full control of the character in real-time combat. The player can use weapons and magic.
 The "Dungeon View" is in the first person perspective, similar to Phantasy Star.
 The "Boss View" puts the player up against a boss from a sideways viewpoint.

Release
After the release of Phantasy Star II in March 1990, Sword of Vermilion was the main role-playing game launched during the Genesis does what Nintendon't campaign.

Sword of Vermilion was one of the last Sega Mega Drive Role-playing games to come with a box-sized hint book. The hint book was 106 pages long.

Reception

Computer and Video Games said it is an "excellent" and "highly compelling arcade/adventure RPG" offering "a vast, sprawling adventure". They praised the "arcade format" action combat system as "great fun" and "an improvement over" Phantasy Star IIs turn-based combat system, found the story to be "engaging and easy to follow" with "intriguing plots and subplots", and considered the music and sound effects "amongst the best" on the Mega Drive. However, they criticized the "decidedly rough" graphics of the "3D screens" but praised the "excellent town graphics" and "detailed sprites."

MegaTech magazine said it was "probably the best RPG on the Mega Drive. A gripping plot combined with user-friendly controls and great presentation". In 1992, Mega placed the game at #11 on their list of top Mega Drive games of all time.

References

Role-playing video games
Action role-playing video games
Sega-AM2 games
Sega Genesis games
Virtual Console games
Nintendo Switch Online games
1989 video games
Fantasy video games
Video games developed in Japan
Video games scored by Hiroshi Kawaguchi